Jordan participated in the 2010 Asian Para Games–First Asian Para Games in Guangzhou, China from 13 to 19 December 2010. Athletes from Jordan won total five medals (including three gold), and finished at the 12th spot in a medal table.

References

Nations at the 2010 Asian Para Games
2010 in Jordanian sport